When Men Betray is a lost 1918 silent film drama directed by Ivan Abramson and starring Gail Kane. It was released on a State Rights basis.

Plot 
Despite urging of wife Marion (Gail Kane) and young daughter Vivian (Juliette Moore), Raymond Edwards (Robert Elliot) intensifies his affair with charming adventuress Lucille Stanton (Sally Crute). Marion attends a reception with Frederick Barton one evening, leaving Raymond free to visit Lucille and leaving Raymond's younger sister Alice (Tallulah Bankhead) alone in the house. Bob Gardner (Jack McLean), who is engaged to Raymond's elder sister Florence, rapes Alice, and that same evening, Raymond finds Frederick in Lucille's room. Realizing the great pain he has caused his wife, Raymond asks for Marion's forgiveness. Bob is killed in a fight with Frederick, whereupon his brother, Dick Gardner (Reid Hamilton), offers to marry Alice to atone for Bob's wrong.

Cast
Gail Kane as Marion Edwards
Robert Elliott as Raymond Edwards
Sally Crute as Lucille Stanton
Gertrude Braun as Florence Stanton
Juliette Moore as Vivian Edwards
Jack McLean as Bob Gardner
Reid Hamilton as Dick Garden
Dora Mills Adams as Mrs. Gardner
Stuart Holmes as Frederick Burton
Tallulah Bankhead (uncredited) as Alice Edwards
Lillian Berse 
Hazel Washburn

References

External links

1918 films
American silent feature films
Lost American films
Films directed by Ivan Abramson
American black-and-white films
Silent American drama films
1918 drama films
1918 lost films
Lost drama films
1910s American films